The Foreshore and Seabed Act 2004 is a former Act of the Parliament of New Zealand. It overruled the 2003 decision of the Court of Appeal in Ngati Apa v Attorney-General. Its passage arose out of, and further fueled, the New Zealand foreshore and seabed controversy.

It was replaced by the Marine and Coastal Area (Takutai Moana) Act in 2011.

See also
New Zealand foreshore and seabed controversy

References

External links
Text of the Act

Māori politics
Statutes of New Zealand
2004 in New Zealand law
Aboriginal title in New Zealand
Repealed New Zealand legislation